Gary Eugene Krug (born February 12, 1955) is an American former professional baseball player. He appeared in seven Major League games as a pinch hitter for the Chicago Cubs during the 1981 season. He had two hits in five at bats, including a single in his first big-league plate appearance on April 29 against Lary Sorensen of the St. Louis Cardinals, in a game that ended in a 2–2 tie.

Krug attended Lamar Community College and  the University of Oklahoma, and was selected by the Cubs in the 29th round of the 1977 Major League Baseball Draft. A first baseman, he batted .317 during his five-season minor league baseball career, with 45 home runs. He drove in 103 runs for the 1978 Bakersfield Outlaws, a co-op team in the Class A California League.

External links

1955 births
Living people
Bakersfield Outlaws players
Baseball players from Kansas
Chicago Cubs players
Gulf Coast Cubs players
Iowa Oaks players
Lamar Runnin' Lopes baseball players
Midland Cubs players
People from Garden City, Kansas
Pompano Beach Cubs players
Wichita Aeros players
American expatriate baseball players in Mexico
Sultanes de Monterrey players
Plataneros de Tabasco players